Partial unilateral lentiginosis  is a cutaneous condition characterized by lentigines located on only one half of the body.

See also 
 Lentigo
 List of cutaneous conditions

References 

Melanocytic nevi and neoplasms